Michael G. Aamodt (born September 1, 1957) is an American industrial and organizational psychology professor at Radford University who has published more than 50 professional journal articles and presented more than 100 papers at professional conferences.

Aamodt is actively involved in SHRM and is the 2009 president of the New River Valley chapter of SHRM as well as the advisor for the Radford University Chapter. He received his B.A. in psychology from Pepperdine University in Malibu, California and both his M.A. and Ph.D. from the University of Arkansas. He has three nieces, Emily Aamodt, Kitty Aamodt, and Liz Aamodt who reside in California.

Areas of research
Police psychology
Industrial and Organizational Psychology
Forensic psychology

Publications

Books 
Industrial/Organizational Psychology: An Applied Approach
Research in Law Enforcement Selection
Law Enforcement Selection: Research Summaries
Understanding Statistics: A Guide for I/O Psychologists and Human Resource Professionals
Human Relations in Business

Journals
Applied HRM Research
Journal of Police and Criminal Psychology
Criminal Justice and Behavior

References

Radford University I/O Psychology home page
Mike Aamodt's Radford University page

21st-century American psychologists
Forensic psychologists
Pepperdine University alumni
Radford University faculty
University of Arkansas alumni
1957 births
Living people
20th-century American psychologists